Schroeder Hill is a rock prominence,  high, located  southeast of Ellis Bluff in the Cumulus Hills. Named by Advisory Committee on Antarctic Names (US-ACAN) for Henry B. Schroeder, United States Antarctic Research Program (USARP) meteorologist at South Pole Station, winter 1964, who was field assistant at Byrd Station, 1964–65.

References

Hills of the Ross Dependency
Dufek Coast